Deraz Kola (also Romanized as Derāz Kolā and Derāz Kalā) is a village in Deraz Kola Rural District, Babol Kenar District, Babol County, Mazandaran Province, Iran. At the 2006 census, its population was 1,226, in 358 families.

References 

Populated places in Babol County